Gangster's Law is a 1969 Italian thriller film directed by Siro Marcellini and starring Klaus Kinski.

Cast
 Klaus Kinski as Quintero
 Maurice Poli as Rino Quintero
 Franco Citti as Bruno Esposito
 Samy Pavel as Franco
 Susy Andersen as Mayde
 Hélène Chanel as Countess Elena Villani
 Micaela Pignatelli as Renato's lover
 Nello Pazzafini as the driver
 Aurora Bautista as Rosi, Bruno's lover

Production
Gangster's Law was filmed on location Genoa.

Release
Gangster's Law was released in Italy on 8 August 1969 where it was distributed by Regional. It grossed a total of 140,995,000 Italian lire on its theatrical release.

References

External links

1969 films
Italian thriller films
1960s Italian-language films
1960s crime thriller films
Films directed by Siro Marcellini
Films scored by Piero Umiliani
1960s Italian films